Charsianon was the name of a Byzantine fortress and the corresponding theme (a military-civilian province) in the region of Cappadocia in central Anatolia (modern Turkey).

History
The fortress of Charsianon (Greek: Χαρσιανόν κάστρον, Charsianon kastron; Arabic: Qal'e-i Ḥarsanōs) is first mentioned in 638, during the first wave of the Muslim conquests, and was allegedly named after a general of Justinian I named Charsios. The fortress is now identified with the ruins of Muşali Kale in the Akdağmadeni district in Yozgat Province).

The Arabs first seized it in 730, and it remained a hotly contested stronghold during the next century of Byzantine–Arab warfare. During the 8th century, it belonged to the Armeniac Theme and was the seat of a military and territorial district (tourma).

In the early 9th century, the fortress became the centre of a kleisoura, a separately administered fortified frontier district. Sometime between 863 and 873, it was raised to the status of a full theme, augmented by territory from the neighbouring Bucellarian, Armeniac and Cappadocian themes. It ranked in the middle tier of themes, with its governing strategos receiving an annual salary of 20 pounds of gold and commanding, according to Arab sources, 4,000 men and four fortresses. 

In the 10th century, the theme of Charsianon became a major stronghold of the landed military aristocracy, with the great clans of Argyros and Maleinos having their homes and estates there. After 1045, a large number of Armenians, including the former king Gagik II (r. 1042–1045), were settled there, leading to friction with the local Greeks. The theme was lost to the Seljuk Turks following the Battle of Manzikert in 1071 and given to Danishmendids. Gagik II is attested as the last doux of Charsianon in 1072–1073.

References

Sources

 
 
 
 
 

Byzantine Cappadocia
Themes of the Byzantine Empire
States and territories established in the 9th century
States and territories disestablished in the 11th century